Stephen Joyce (born 4 July 1957) is an Irish Gaelic football manager and former player who played as a left corner-forward for the Galway senior team. He is a former manager of the Galway minor team.

Honours

Player

 Galway
 Connacht Senior Football Championship (5): 1982, 1983, 1984, 1986, 1987

Selector

 Galway
 All-Ireland Senior Football Championship (2): 1998, 2001
 Connacht Senior Football Championship (4): 1998, 2000, 2002, 2003

Manager

 Naomh Pádraig, Clonbur
 All-Ireland Junior Club Football Championship (1): 2012
 Connacht Junior Club Football Championship (1): 2011
 Galway Junior Football Championship (1): 2011

 Galway
 Connacht Minor Football Championship (2): 2015, 2016

References

1957 births
Living people
Clonbur Gaelic footballers
Galway inter-county Gaelic footballers
Gaelic football managers
Gaelic football selectors